The 1971 Rothmans International Quebec – Singles was an event of the 1971 Rothmans International Quebec men's tennis tournament held at the Laval University sports centre in Quebec City, Quebec in Canada from 26 July through 1 August 1971. The draw comprised 30 players. Tom Okker won the singles title, defeating Rod Laver in the final, 6–3, 7–6, 6–7, 6–4.

Draw

Finals

Top half

Bottom half

References

External links
 ITF tournament edition details

Quebec WCT Tournament
Tennis in Canada
1971 in Canadian tennis